The 1997 West Coast Conference men's basketball tournament took place on March 1–3, 1997. All rounds were held in Los Angeles, California at the Gersten Pavilion.

The Saint Mary's Gaels won the WCC Tournament title and an automatic bid to the 1997 NCAA tournament. Brad Millard of Saint Mary's was named Tournament MVP.

Also of note is that through the 2023 edition, this was the last WCC men's tournament in which Gonzaga did not make the final.

Format
With eight teams participating, all eight teams were placed into the first round, with teams seeded and paired based on regular-season records. After the first round, teams were re-seeded so the highest-remaining team was paired with the lowest-remaining time in one semifinal with the other two teams slotted into the other semifinal.

Bracket

References

1996–97 West Coast Conference men's basketball season
West Coast Conference men's basketball tournament
West Coast Athletic Conference men's basketball tournament
West Coast Athletic Conference men's basketball tournament
West Coast Athletic Conference men's basketball tournament